The Cocked, Locked, Ready to Rock Tour was a concert tour by American hard rock band Aerosmith that took place during mid-2010. In late spring and early summer of 2010, the band performed in South America and Europe, respectively, marking their first concerts on those continents since 2007. During the second half of summer, the band toured North America. Prior to the tour, the band confirmed that the lead singer would be Steven Tyler, after rumors of his departure in late 2009.

The tour included a headlining show at Download Festival, playing the festival's venue – Donington Park – for the first time in 16 years. Aerosmith also performed in Venezuela, Chile, Costa Rica, and Romania for the first time in 16 years. The tour also saw the band perform in Peru and Greece for the first time in their careers.

In North America, the band played in many locations that they missed due to the cancellation of dates on their prior Guitar Hero Aerosmith Tour in 2009.

In total, Aerosmith performed in 18 countries on this tour.

Tour dates

Top 50 Worldwide Tours 2010: #34
Total Gross: US $36.4 million
Total Attendance: 478,192 (counting only the 39 shows)

Personnel 
Aerosmith members:
 Steven Tyler – lead vocals, harmonica, piano
 Tom Hamilton – bass
 Joey Kramer – drums
 Joe Perry – lead and rhythm guitar, backing and lead vocals, talkbox
 Brad Whitford – rhythm and lead guitar

Additional musicians
 Russ Irwin – keyboards, backing vocals

Set 
For the set, Aerosmith played an average of about 16 to 20 songs at each show, with a good mix from the different eras of their catalog. About 14 to 18 songs comprised the main set, with an additional 2 or 3 songs played during the encore. The concert in The Woodlands featured 5 songs in the encore, but featured a shorter main set. During the North American leg of the tour, the setlist whittled away from 20 songs at the start of the tour down to 17 songs in the middle of the tour, but went back up to 20 songs for the Tinley Park and Uncasville shows, and ranged from 17 to 19 songs at other shows. In addition, a drum solo by Joey Kramer occurred during the middle of the set, and at most concerts, Joe Perry performed a duel against the Guitar Hero: Aerosmith version of himself, like the previous year's Guitar Hero Aerosmith Tour, before performing a song in which he sang lead vocals (either "Stop Messin' Around", "Red House", or "Combination").

List of songs played on tour

Problems 
While there were little to no problems during the South American and European legs of the tour, tension within the band grew during the North American leg. The tension began when rumors began to circulate in late July and early August that Steven Tyler would replace Simon Cowell as judge on the television series American Idol. Joe Perry criticized Tyler for not consulting the rest of the band, saying that he "found out on the internet, like the rest of the world" and that nobody else in the band knew anything about it. On August 18, many news outlets began to report that Tyler had indeed signed with Fox.

At the band's August 12 show at Nikon at Jones Beach Theater in Wantagh, New York, Tyler accidentally hit Joe Perry in the head with his microphone stand during the end of "Sweet Emotion", not realizing that Perry had approached the drum riser that Tyler was standing on. In the ensuing incident, the injured Perry threw down his guitar in anger while Tyler was checking to see if he was OK and stormed off the stage, but returned to finish the concert.

At the band's August 17 show at the Air Canada Centre in Toronto, Tyler playfully bumped Perry while both were performing the second song "Love in an Elevator" on the catwalk. In retaliation, Perry playfully bumped Tyler back, but the bump caught Tyler off guard and Tyler tumbled off-stage into the audience. Tyler was previously injured in a fall off-stage in August 2009 which caused the rest of the band's Guitar Hero Aerosmith Tour to be canceled. Tyler was caught by members of the audience and crew and was helped back on-stage by Perry. In retaliation, Tyler spun Perry around and said "It ain't gonna happen again baby", then stated to Perry "You will pay for that, my brother". Later during the same concert, Tyler changed the lyrics of "Livin' on the Edge" to "We're seeing things in a different way/And Joe knows it ain't his".

References 
http://www.aeroforceone.com/index.cfm/pk/view/cd/NAA/cdid/1250674/pid/302766

Aerosmith concert tours
2010 concert tours